Vladyslav Serhiyovych Savchenko (born 4 February 2004) is a Ukrainian professional footballer who plays as a goalkeeper for Ukrainian club Volyn Lutsk.

References

External links
 Profile on Volyn Lutsk official website
 

2004 births
Living people
People from Baryshivka
Ukrainian footballers
Association football goalkeepers
FC Volyn Lutsk players
Ukrainian Second League players
Sportspeople from Kyiv Oblast